WCH may refer to:

Hospitals
Women's and Children's Hospital, North Adelaide, Australia
Women's College Hospital, Ontario, Canada

Transportation

Airlines
Nuevo Chaitén Airport (IATA airport code WCH), Chaitén, Chile

Rail
Warechah railway station (station code WCH), Pakistan
Whitchurch railway station (Hampshire), (National Rail station code WCH), Whitchurch, Hampshire
Wong Chuk Hang station (MTR station code WCH), Hong Kong
Wuchang railway station (Pinyin station code WCH), Wuhan, China

Other uses
World Cup of Hockey, an international ice hockey tournament